Praxis is a peer-reviewed online postgraduate journal of philosophy affiliated with the University of Manchester. The journal was created in 2007. The first issue was published in April 2008. Praxis publishes papers, book reviews and interviews.

Notable interviews

Tim Crane (University of Cambridge)
Peter Goldie (University of Manchester)
Barry Hoffmaster (University of Western Ontario)
John Harris (University of Manchester)
Ronald de Sousa (University of Toronto)

Editorial team

Editor

Pablo López-Silva (University of Manchester)

 Book Editor

Leo Tarasov (University of Manchester)

Editorial Assistant

Aaron Wilson (University of Manchester)

Consulting Board 
 Prof Tim Bayne (University of Manchester)
 Prof Helen Beebee (University of Manchester)
 Prof Thomas Uebel (University of Manchester)
 Prof Cynthia Macdonald (University of Manchester)
 Dr Joel Smith (University of Manchester)

Academic Board
David Chalmers (Australian National University); Peter Galison (University of Harvard); Marc Lange (University of North Carolina at Capel Hill); Jonathan Lowe (University of Durham); Daniel Nolan (Australian National University); David Papineau (King's College London); Stefano Predelli (University of Nottingham); Ronnie de Sousa (University of Toronto); Howard Wettstein (University of California Riverside); Dan Zahavi (University of Copenhagen)

Past editors
 2011–2012: Howard Kelly and Andy Routledge
 2010–2011: Jean Moritz Mueller and Hichem Naar
 2007–2009: Vasco Castela and Paula Satne Jones

Notes

External links
 Praxis, Postgraduate Journal of Philosophy
 University of Manchester Philosophy Department

Philosophy journals
English-language journals
Publications established in 2008